is an interchange passenger railway station in located in the city of Hanyū, Saitama, Japan, jointly operated by the private railway operators Tōbu Railway and Chichibu Railway.

Lines

Station layout

The station consists of three island platforms serving four Tōbu tracks (numbered 1 to 4) and two Chichibu Line tracks (numbered 4 to 5).

Platforms

History

The Tōbu station opened on 23 April 1903.

The station was rebuilt with the station building located over the tracks, formally completed on 22 October 2004.

From the start of the revised timetable on 18 March 2006, a new up track was added on the east side of the station to allow non-stop trains to pass, and the Tobu platforms were renumbered accordingly.

From 17 March 2012, station numbering was introduced on all Tōbu lines, with Hanyū Station becoming "TI-07".

Passenger statistics
In fiscal 2019, the Tōbu station was used by an average of 13,591 passengers daily (boarding passengers only). and the Chichibu Railway station was used by an average of 4,804 passengers daily in fiscal 2018.

Surrounding area
 Hanyū City Office
 Saitama Junshin Junior College
 Saitama Prefectural Hanyū High School

See also
 List of railway stations in Japan

References

External links

 *  station information  
 Chichibu Railway Hanyū Station timetable 

Tobu Isesaki Line
Stations of Tobu Railway
Railway stations in Saitama Prefecture
Railway stations in Japan opened in 1903
Railway stations in Japan opened in 1921